North District Sports Ground is a multi-purpose sports ground located at 26 Tin Ping Road, Sheung Shui, New Territories, Hong Kong. It is managed by the Leisure and Cultural Services Department of Hong Kong Government.

Facilities
 Covered grandstand
 Natural grass football field
 400m running track

External links

 Leisure and Cultural Services Department - North District Sports Ground

Football venues in Hong Kong
Sports venues in Hong Kong
Sheung Shui